Pandemonia is a character and persona created as conceptual art by an anonymous London-based artist that has appeared in the art and fashion world since 2009. Clad in a latex full-head mask with stylized hair and latex dresses, Pandemonia is seven feet tall and was described by Katia Ganfield of Vice as "Roy Lichtenstein's blonde caricatures ... brought to life as a 7 ft Jeff Koons inflatable". She is often accompanied by an inflatable white dog named Snowy.

Pandemonia told Stylist:

Initially a "crasher" at fashion and social events, Pandemonia eventually became a London Fashion Week VIP guest.

Pandemonia is a critical reflection and, as such, an intervention upon ideas of celebrity and femininity. She is a pointed manifestation of how these ideas intersect with mass media, social media, and the marketability of desire. The art of Pandemonia herself is that of a constructed figure placed in the landscape of media, fashion and art events that has instigated the media response by feeding back to the media its own language, imagery and ideals.

The growth of Pandemonia's celebrity is one of the themes in her art, which also explores archetypes of pop myth and reality.

Pandemonia's art is not only cross-media (sculpture, digital art, photography, and performance), but also cross-generational as she ties the earliest moments of Pop Art to the most current worlds of celebrity, fashion and contemporary art, creating an arc and evolution which continues its ongoing exploration.

In 2016, Pandemonia was chosen by Camper as the protagonist and muse for its Kobarah shoe style, and has been featured in stores and billboards in several major cities including Paris, London, New York, and Tokyo.

References

External links
 

Conceptual art
Fictional characters introduced in 2009
Fictional British people
Celebrity